Dr Katrina Louise Warren (born 8 December 1967) is an Australian veterinarian, best known as the co-host of several popular television programs on Channel 7.

Career
After working as a fashion model in Japan, Warren first appeared on television screens in the Ten Network's children's program Totally Wild in 1994.

Warren is best known for her appearances from 1997 on the Seven Network family show Harry's Practice as a resident vet.  She was the star of "Beverly Hills Vet" a show produced by Animal Planet in 2003. She also appeared in 2004 as a contestant on Australia's Dancing with the Stars. Warren also presented on the Channel Seven lifestyle show Melbourne Weekender with Jo Silvagni.

From 2008 to 2010, Warren worked as a host of the TV Show Housecat Housecall on Animal Planet in the US.

Personal life
Warren gave birth to her daughter Charlotte Darcy in 2007. Warren and her husband, Anthony Darcy, separated 15 months later. Warren lives in Sydney.

References

External links 
 

1967 births
Australian veterinarians
People educated at James Ruse Agricultural High School
University of Sydney alumni
Living people
Women veterinarians
Australian women television presenters